Constantina is a Spanish municipality located in the province of Seville, in Andalusia. It has a population of 6,757 (2006) and an area of 483 km². It is 87 km from the provincial capital, Seville.

See also
Sierra Norte de Sevilla

References

External links
 Ayuntamiento de Constantina 
 Constantina at the Instituto de Estadística de Andalucía 

Municipalities of the Province of Seville